Adel Najafzadeh (born 1973) is an Iranian politician. He was born in Khoy, West Azerbaijan province. He is a member of the tenth Islamic Consultative Assembly from the electorate of Khoy and Chaypareh.

References

People from Khoy
Living people
1973 births
Members of the 11th Islamic Consultative Assembly
Shahid Beheshti University